Sugomel is a genus of bird in the honeyeater family Meliphagidae.

It contains two species, one native to Australia and the other endemic to the Lesser Sunda Islands of Indonesia:

 Scaly-crowned honeyeater (Sugomel lombokium)
 Black honeyeater (Sugomel nigrum)

Prior to 2022, the black honeyeater was considered the only species in the genus, but the International Ornithological Congress reclassified S. lombokius (formerly in Lichmera) into Sugomel based on a phylogenetic analysis finding it to be the sister species to S. niger.

References 

Sugomel
Bird genera
Taxa named by Gregory Mathews